Vorontsov-Vel'yaminov Interacting Galaxies are those included in the Atlas and Catalogue of Interacting Galaxies, by B.A. Vorontsov-Vel'yaminov, R.I. Noskova and V.P. Arkhipova. It was published by the Astronomical Council of the Academy of Sciences of the USSR.

The atlas and catalogue contain 852 interacting systems. The first part published in 1959 contained 355 interacting galaxies numbered VV1 through VV355, and the second part published in the  1970s included those numbered VV356 through VV852. In 2001, an additional 1162 objects were added from the Morphological Catalogue of Galaxies by Vorontsov-Vel'yaminov et al. These objects have numbers ranging from VV853 to VV2014.

References

External links 
The Catalogue of Interacting Galaxies by Vorontsov-Velyaminov - at Sternberg Astronomical Institute website

Astronomical catalogues of galaxies
Astronomy in the Soviet Union